The Royal Bank of Queensland was a bank in Queensland, Australia.

History
The Royal Bank of Queensland commenced operation in  Brisbane in February 1886.

In 1917 it merged with the Bank of North Queensland creating the Bank of Queensland.   In 1922  the Bank of Queensland merged with the National Bank of Australasia.

Head Office 

The early head office was built in 1891 at 180 Queen Street, but this building was replaced in 1929-30 by the successor company, and the replacement is a heritage-listed building of the (now) National Australia Bank.

Heritage listings
A number of former Royal Bank of Queensland buildings are still standing and are now heritage listed, including:
 Royal Bank of Queensland, Gympie
 Royal Bank of Queensland, Helidon
 Royal Bank of Queensland, Lowood
 Royal Bank of Queensland, Maryborough

References

 
Defunct banks of Australia
1886 establishments in Australia
Economic history of Queensland
Banks established in 1886
1917 disestablishments in Australia
Banks disestablished in 1917
1917 mergers and acquisitions